Antongilus is a genus of beetles belonging to the family Histeridae.

Species:

Antongilus bengalensis 
Antongilus biroi 
Antongilus cribrifrons 
Antongilus goliath 
Antongilus terricola

References

Histeridae